Established in 1972, Maseelah Trading Company is a limited liability Kuwaiti establishment entirely owned by the Al-Mulla Group. Its principal activities include the sale and servicing of passenger cars and commercial vehicles, industrial equipment and heavy machinery, fire fighting systems, office automation equipment and consumer electronics

With over one 2,000 employees, Maseelah Trading Company is the authorized distributor for Mitsubishi Mitsubishi Motors, Sharp, Kato Works, Nippon Yusoki, Kukuyo International, Andrex Radiation Products, Radiographic Supplies and VAPAC Humidity Control.

A wholly owned subsidiary of Al Mulla Group Holding Company, Maseelah Trading Company has been able to win the Best Distributor in the Middle East award from Mitsubishi for 7 consecutive years, due to its leading market share in the Kuwaiti automotive market.  Through a network of over 15 different service, parts, and sales outlets, Maseelah Trading Company has been able to maintain its market share and reputation as one of the best automotive distributors in the region.

See also
List of companies of Kuwait

References

Companies based in Kuwait City